Orthodox Marxism is the body of Marxist thought that emerged after the death of Karl Marx (1818–1883) and which became the official philosophy of the majority of the socialist movement as represented in the Second International until the First World War in 1914. Orthodox Marxism aims to simplify, codify and systematize Marxist method and theory by clarifying the perceived ambiguities and contradictions of classical Marxism.

The philosophy of orthodox Marxism argues that material development (advances in technology in the productive forces) is the primary agent of change in the structure of society. Orthodox Marxists believe that certain social systems (e.g. feudalism, capitalism and so on) become contradictory as productive forces develop, resulting in social revolutions in response to those mounting contradictions. This revolutionary change is the vehicle for fundamental society-wide changes, and ultimately leads to the emergence of new economic systems.

In the term orthodox Marxism, the word "orthodox" refers to the methods of historical materialism and of dialectical materialism—and not the normative aspects inherent to classical Marxism, without implying dogmatic adherence to the results of Marx's investigations.

One of the most prominent historical proponents of orthodox Marxism was the Czech-Austrian theorist Karl Kautsky.

Theory 

The emergence of orthodox Marxism is associated with the latter works of Friedrich Engels, such as the Dialectics of Nature and Socialism: Utopian and Scientific, which were efforts to popularise the work of Karl Marx, render it systematic and apply it to the fundamental questions of philosophy. Daniel De Leon, an early American socialist leader, contributed much to the thought during the final years of the 19th century and the early 20th century. Orthodox Marxism was further developed during the Second International by thinkers such as Georgi Plekhanov and Karl Kautsky in Erfurt Program and The Class Struggle (Erfurt Program). 

The characteristics of orthodox Marxism are:
 A strong version of the theory that the economic base (material conditions) determines the cultural and political superstructure of society. In its most extensive form, this view is called economic determinism, economism and vulgar materialism. A related variation is that of technological determinism.
 The view that capitalism cannot be reformed through policy and that any attempt to do so would only exacerbate its contradictions or distort the efficiency of the market economy (in contrast to reformism). Orthodox Marxism holds that the only viable and lasting solution to the contradictions of capitalism is for the establishment of a post-capitalist socialist economy.
 The centrality of class as a process and the view that existing policymakers and government is largely and structurally beholden to the interests of the ruling class. This view is called instrumental Marxism.
 The claim that Marxist methodology is a science.
 The attempt to make Marxism a total system, adapting it to changes within the realm of current events and knowledge.
 An understanding of ideology in terms of false consciousness.
 That every open class struggle is a political struggle.
 A pre-crisis emphasis on organizing an independent, mass workers' movement (in the form of welfare, recreational, educational and cultural organizations) and especially its political party, combining reform struggles and mass strikes without overreliance on either. 
 The socialist revolution is necessarily the act of the majority (contrasted with Marxism–Leninism's view of the vanguard party and democratic centralism).

Orthodox Marxism is contrasted with revisionist Marxism as developed in post-First World War Social Democratic parties. Some writers also contrast it with Marxism–Leninism as it developed in the Soviet Union, while others describe the latter as firmly within orthodoxy: Orthodox Marxism rested on and grew out of the European working class movement that emerged in the final quarter of the 19th century and continued in that form until the middle years of the twentieth century. Its two institutional expressions were the 2nd and 3rd Internationals, which despite the great schism in 1919, were marked by a shared conception of capital and labour. Their fortunes therefore rose and fell together. Trotskyism and Left communism were equally orthodox in their thinking and approach, and therefore must be considered left-variants of this tradition.

Two variants of orthodox Marxism are impossibilism and anti-revisionism. Impossibilism is a form of orthodox Marxism that both rejects the reformism of revisionist Marxism and opposes the Leninist theories of imperialism, vanguardism and democratic centralism (which argue that socialism can be constructed in underdeveloped, quasi-feudal countries through revolutionary action as opposed to being an emergent result of advances in material development). An extreme form of this position is held by the Socialist Party of Great Britain. In contrast, the anti-revisionist tradition criticised official Communist parties from the opposite perspective as having abandoned the orthodox Marxism of the founders.

Variants 
A number of theoretical perspectives and political movements emerged that were firmly rooted in orthodox Marxist analysis, as contrasted with later interpretations and alternative developments in Marxist theory and practice such as Marxism–Leninism, revisionism and reformism.

Impossibilism 

Impossibilism stresses the limited value of economic, social, cultural and political reforms under capitalism and posits that socialists and Marxists should solely focus on efforts to propagate and establish socialism, disregarding any other cause that has no connection to the goal of the realization of socialism.

Impossibilism posits that reforms to capitalism are counterproductive because they strengthen support for capitalism by the working class by making its conditions more tolerable while creating further contradictions of their own, while removing the socialist character of the parties championing and implementing said reforms. Because reforms cannot solve the systemic contradictions of capitalism, impossibilism opposes reformism, revisionism and ethical socialism.

Impossibilism also opposes the idea of a vanguard-led revolution and the centralization of political power in any elite group of people as espoused by Leninism and Marxism–Leninism.

This perspective is maintained by the World Socialist Movement, De Leonism, and to some extent followers of Karl Kautsky and pre-reformist social democracy.

Leninism 

Kautsky and to a lesser extent Plekhanov were in turn major influences on Vladimir Lenin, whose version of Marxism was known as Leninism by its contemporaries. The official thought of the Third International was based in orthodox Marxism combined with Leninist views on revolutionary organization initially. The terms dialectical materialism and historical materialism are associated with this phase of orthodox Marxism. Rosa Luxemburg, Hal Draper and Rudolf Hilferding are prominent thinkers in the orthodox Marxist tradition.

Orthodox Marxism is contrasted with later variations of Marxism, notably revisionism and Stalinism. In contrast to Stalin's idea of the socialism in a single backward country, orthodox Marxists said that Imperial Russia was too backwards for the development of socialism and would first have to undergo a capitalist (bourgeois) phase of development even if a Marxist party would head its government. Lenin urged a socialist revolution in Russia to inspire a socialist revolution in Germany and in the majority of the developed countries. His and Bukharin's New Economic Policy was to develop capitalism in Russia initially.

Luxemburgism 
Luxemburgism is an informal designation for a current of Marxist thought and practice that originates from the ideas and work of Rosa Luxemburg. In particular, it stresses the importance for spontaneous revolution which can only emerge in response to mounting contradictions between the productive forces and social relations of society and therefore rejects Leninism and Bolshevism for its insistence on a "hands-on" approach to revolution. Luxemburgism is also highly critical of the reformist Marxism that emerged from the work of Eduard Bernstein's informal faction of the Social Democratic Party of Germany. According to Rosa Luxemburg, under reformism "[capitalism] is not overthrown, but is on the contrary strengthened by the development of social reforms".

Trotskyism 

The tradition founded by Leon Trotsky purports that the USSR was a "degenerated workers' state" on the basis that, although maintaining that it held onto some aspects of a revolutionary workers' state (such as state control of foreign trade or the expropriation of the bourgeoisie), it lacked key aspects it used to have, namely soviet democracy and freedom of organization for workers, which only benefitted a bureaucracy led by Joseph Stalin. In his book The Revolution Betrayed, Trotsky supports a multi-party democratic model of revolutionary organizations and proposes a solution for the USSR's bureaucratic caste, that of a political revolution that reinstates those aspects the bureaucrats erased. Trotskyists maintain that the countries of the Eastern bloc, China, North Korea, Vietnam, Cuba and others were "deformed workers' states" which needed political revolutions while critically defending these countries from imperialist aggressions.

Anti-Stalinist Left

Menshevism 

Menshevism refers to the political positions taken by the Menshevik faction of the Russian Social Democratic Labour Party prior to the October Revolution of 1917. The Mensheviks believed that socialism could not be realized in Russia due to its backwards economic conditions and that Russia would first have to experience a bourgeois revolution and go through a capitalist stage of development before socialism became technically possible and before the working class could develop the class consciousness for a socialist revolution. The Mensheviks were thus opposed to the Bolshevik idea of a vanguard party and their pursuit of socialist revolution in semi-feudal Russia.

Karl Kautsky and "Kautskyism" 

Karl Kautsky is recognized as the most authoritative promulgator of orthodox Marxism following the death of Friedrich Engels in 1895. As an advisor to August Bebel, leader of the Social Democratic Party of Germany (SPD) until Bebel's death in 1913 and as editor of Die Neue Zeit from 1883 till 1917, he was known as the "Pope of Marxism". He was removed as editor by the leadership of the SPD when the Independent Social Democratic Party of Germany (USPD) split away from the SPD. Kautsky was an outspoken critic of Bolshevism and Leninism, seeing the Bolsheviks (or Communists as they had renamed themselves after 1917) as an organization that had gained power by a coup and initiated revolutionary changes for which there was no economic rationale in Russia. Kautsky was also opposed to Eduard Bernstein's reformist politics in the period 1896–1901.

Instrumental Marxism 

Instrumental Marxism is a theory derived from classical Marxism which reasons that policy makers in government and positions of power tend to "share a common business or class background, and that their decisions will reflect their business or class interests".

Criticism 

There have been a number of criticisms of orthodox Marxism from within the socialist movement. From the 1890s during the Second International, Eduard Bernstein and others developed a position known as revisionism, which sought to revise Marx's views based on the idea that the progressive development of capitalism and the extension of democracy meant that gradual, parliamentary reform could achieve socialism. But Bernstein himself was a revolutionary and joined the Independent Social Democratic Party in Germany which advocated for a socialist republic in 1918. This view was contested by orthodox Marxists such as Kautsky as well as by the young Georg Lukacs, who in 1919 clarified the definition of orthodox Marxism as thus: [O]rthodoxy refers exclusively to method. It is the scientific conviction that dialectical materialism is the road to truth and that its methods can be developed, expanded and deepened only along the lines laid down by its founders. It is the conviction, moreover, that all attempts to surpass or 'improve' it have led and must lead to over-simplification, triviality and eclecticism.

Western Marxism, the intellectual Marxism which developed in Western Europe from the 1920s onwards, sought to make Marxism more "sophisticated", open and flexible by examining issues like culture that were outside the field of orthodox Marxism. Western Marxists, such as Georg Lukács, Karl Korsch, Antonio Gramsci and the Frankfurt School, have tended to be open to influences orthodox Marxists consider bourgeois, such as psychoanalysis and the sociology of Max Weber. Marco Torres illustrates the shift away from orthodox Marxism in the Frankfurt School: In the early 1920s, the original members of the Frankfurt Institute—half forgotten names such as Carl Grünberg, Henryk Grossman and Karl August Wittfogel, were social scientists of an orthodox Marxist conviction. They understood their task as an advancement of the sciences that would prove useful in solving the problems of a Europe-wide transition into socialism, which they saw, if not as inevitable, at least as highly likely. But as fascism reared its head in Germany and throughout Europe, the younger members of the Institute saw the necessity for a different kind of Marxist Scholarship. Beyond accumulating knowledge relevant to an orthodox Marxist line, they felt the need to take the more critical and negative approach that is required for the maintenance of an integral and penetrating understanding of society during a moment of reaction. This could be described as the politically necessary transition from Marxist positive science to Critical Theory.

In parallel to this, Cedric Robinson has identified a Black Marxist tradition, including people like C.L.R. James and W. E. B. Du Bois, who have opened Marxism to the study of race.

In the postwar period, the New Left and new social movements gave rise to intellectual and political currents which again challenged orthodox Marxism. These include Italian autonomism, French Situationism, the Yugoslavian Praxis School, British cultural studies, Marxist feminism, Marxist humanism, analytical Marxism and critical realism.

See also 

 Classical Marxism
 Impossibilism
 Instrumental Marxism
 Luxemburgism
 Materialist conception of history
 Marxian economics
 Marxism–Leninism
 Marxist revisionism
 Menshevik
 Scientific socialism
 Technological determinism
 Left communism

References

External links 

 Lukács What is Orthodox Marxism (1919)

Economic ideologies
Eponymous political ideologies
Marxist schools of thought

Sociological theories
Types of socialism